The 1895 Dartmouth football team represented Dartmouth College as a member of the Triangular Football League during the 1895 college football season. Head coach William Wurtenburg scheduled a 13-game season for 1895, a still-standing record at Dartmouth for most games played in a single year. The team compiled an overall record of 7–5–1 with a mark of 2–0 in TFL play, winning the league title. The season began with a 50–0 shutout of Phillips Exeter Academy, which was followed by a close game with Harvard. The match was hard-fought; Harvard won by a slim 4–0 margin, the closest that a Dartmouth team had gotten to beating Harvard. The squad then played three smaller colleges, winning two of the games and tying the other. Conference opponents Williams and Amherst were defeated by a combined score of 30–5, and the team was awarded its third straight Triangular Football League championship. The season ended on a negative note, however, with a close 10–4 loss to Brown.

Schedule

References

Dartmouth
Dartmouth Big Green football seasons
Dartmouth football